This is a non-exhaustive list of Moldova women's international footballers – association football players who have appeared at least once for the senior Moldova women's national football team.

Players

See also 
 Moldova women's national football team

References 

 Moldova women's international footballers
Moldova
Association football player non-biographical articles